The World Group was the highest level of Fed Cup competition in 1998. Eight nations competed in a three-round knockout competition. France was the defending champion, but they were defeated in the semifinals by Switzerland. Spain defeated Switzerland to capture their fifth title.

Participating Teams

Draw

First round

France vs. Belgium

Switzerland vs. Czech Republic

Spain vs. Germany

United States vs. Netherlands

Semifinals

France vs. Switzerland

Spain vs. United States

Final

Switzerland vs. Spain

References

See also
Fed Cup structure

World Group